Jeanne d'Arc au bûcher (Joan of Arc at the Stake) is an oratorio by Arthur Honegger, originally commissioned by Ida Rubinstein. It was set to a libretto by Paul Claudel, and the work runs about 70 minutes.

It premiered on 12 May 1938 in Basel, with Rubinstein as Jeanne, and Jean Périer in the speaking role of Brother Dominique, with the Basel Boys Choir singing the children's chorus part, and Paul Sacher conducting.

The drama takes place during Joan of Arc's last minutes on the stake, with flashbacks to her trial and her younger days. Honegger entitled his work a dramatic oratorio, adding speaking roles and actors. The work has an important part for the ondes Martenot, an early electronic instrument (played at the premiere by its inventor Maurice Martenot).

Claudel's dramatic frame provided Honegger with a space – between heaven and earth, past and present – where he could mix styles from the popular to the sublime. A hybrid work: partly oratorio and partly opera, Honegger uses all his musical means, monody, harmony and counterpoint to build towards sculpted blocks of sound.

Performance history
At its première in Basel the piece was an immediate success, with critics almost unanimous in praising a perfect cohesion between words and music. On 6 May 1939, after rehearsals at the Salle Pleyel in Paris, the work was semi-staged with designs by Alexandre Benois at the Théâtre Municipal in Orléans conducted by Louis Fourestier.

The work was heard again in Basel on 12 May 1939 and then in Zürich on 14 May. On 13 June that year at the Palais de Chaillot, it was conducted by Charles Munch (who also gave the United States premiere in New York in 1948). After the outbreak of war the work was performed at the Salle Pleyel on 22 February 1940 and in Brussels on 29 February that year. Sacher and Rubinstein made abortive plans for further performances that year, including the Lucerne Festival. On 26 February 1947 Rubinstein organised a concert performance at the Palais des Fêtes in Strasbourg, conducted by Fritz Münch (brother of Charles), which was repeated the following year on 13 June 1948 in the presence of the composer. The work was first performed in Canada at the Montreal Festivals in 1953 under conductor Wilfrid Pelletier.

In December 1953 Roberto Rossellini directed a staged version of the oratorio in Italian translation at the Teatro di San Carlo in Naples with Ingrid Bergman in the title role. It was subsequently performed at La Scala. Both performances received excellent reviews. Rossellini then staged it at the Paris Opera in the original French, again to critical success. He also filmed the San Carlo production in both French and Italian versions. The film was released in Italy in 1954 under the Italian title Giovanna d'Arco al rogo. It proved to be a box-office failure and the French version was never released.

The oratorio was part of the 1957/1958 New York Philharmonic season at Carnegie Hall (April, three performances, broadcast), with Felicia Montealegre Bernstein as Jeanne d'Arc, Adele Addison as the Virgin Mary, Leontyne Price as St Marguerite, Martial Singher as Brother Dominique, Frances Bible as St Catherine and Leonard Bernstein conducting.

Marion Cotillard has starred as Joan of Arc in live performances of the oratorio several times, first in 2005, in Orléans, France, with the Orléans Symphony Orchestra, directed by Jean-Pierre Loisil. In 2012 in Barcelona, Spain, with the Barcelona Symphony Orchestra, directed by Marc Soustrot. In June 2015, she performed the oratorio with the New York Philharmonic at Avery Fisher Hall.

Roles
Jeanne d'Arc, spoken (dancer) – Ida Rubinstein
Virgin Mary, soprano – Berthe de Vigier
St Marguerite/First voice, soprano – Rosa van Herck
St Catherine, contralto – Ginevra Vivante
Brother Dominique, spoken – Jean Périer
Porcus, tenor – Ernst Bauer
Heurtebise/Clerk, tenor – Charles Vaucher
Second voice/First herald – Serge Chandoz
Second herald/Third voice, bass
Narrator, spoken
Master of ceremonies, spoken
Third herald, spoken
Duke of Bedford, spoken
Jean de Luxembourg, spoken
Regnault de Chartres, spoken
, spoken
Perrot

References
Notes

Sources

 
 
 

Compositions by Arthur Honegger
Oratorios
Works about Joan of Arc
1938 compositions
Compositions with a narrator
1938 operas
Commissioned music